María Bores Vázquez (born 11 November 1997) is a Spanish footballer who plays as a defender for Rayo Vallecano.

Club career
Bores started her career at Madrid CFF.

References

External links
Profile at La Liga

1997 births
Living people
Women's association football defenders
Spanish women's footballers
Footballers from Madrid
Madrid CFF players
Atlético Madrid Femenino players
Sevilla FC (women) players
Rayo Vallecano Femenino players
Primera División (women) players
Spain women's youth international footballers
21st-century Spanish women